Keay is an English surname, pronounced [keɪ] (KAY); it is a variant of the surname Kay. Notable people with the surname include:

Anna Keay (born 1974), British historian
Jack Keay (born 1960), Scottish footballer
John Keay (born 1941), British historian, journalist and writer
John Seymour Keay (1839-1909), Scottish businessman and a Member of UK Parliament
Nigel Keay (born 1955), New Zealand musician
Ronald William John Keay (1920–1998), British botanist
Watty Keay (1871–1943), Scottish footballer

See also
5007 Keay, main-belt asteroid
Keays

References